University World News (UWN) is an online publication that reports on higher education news and developments from a global perspective.

It is published as a free weekly emailed newsletter and website with original reports by correspondents from around the world, as well as commentary articles by academics and professionals working or interested in higher education, and global summaries of higher education news, analysis, and features published by reputable newspapers, magazines, and higher education organisations.

UWN comprises and is owned by a large network of senior education journalists from all regions of the world. It published its first issue in October 2007. UWN journalists report on the whole spectrum of higher education from top world-ranking universities to institutions in more marginalised parts of the globe where universities are not strongly reported.

UWN also publishes a fortnightly Africa edition that has been supported by the Ford Foundation and the Carnegie Corporation of New York. The publication has a close partnership with the Center for International Higher Education at Boston College.

It was an exclusive media partner to the UNESCO World Conference on Higher Education in 2022 and a media partner to the OECD's Institutional Management in Higher Education conference in Paris in September 2010.

In 2016, it has been the media partner for Going Global of the British Council.

References

External links 
 

Weekly magazines published in the United Kingdom
Magazines established in 2007
Weekly newspapers published in the United Kingdom